Catholic propaganda may refer to:

 The activity of the Sacred Congregation for the Propagation of the Faith
 The activity of the Congregation (Roman Curia) during the Counter-Reformation

See also 
 Propaganda during the Reformation